James William Campbell (born March 14, 1947), was a member of the Maryland House of Delegates, District 42.

Background
James W. Campbell was first elected to the Maryland House of Delegates in 1979.  He served until 2003.  He was defeated in the 2002 general election when District 42 was redrawn.  The newly redrawn district elected Republicans Susan Aumann, John G. Trueschler, and William J. Frank.

Education
Campbell attended Severna Park High School in Anne Arundel County, Maryland.  After high school he went to the University of Baltimore, where he earned his Bachelor of Arts degree in 1969.  He returned to college and finished with his Master of Social Work, M.S.W., from the University of Maryland School of Social Work in 1976.

Career
Delegate Campbell worked as a social worker before being elected.  As a member of the Maryland House of Delegates, Campbell served on several committees including: the Constitutional and Administrative Law Committee from 1979 until 1985, the Ways and Means Committee, from 1986 until 2003, and he was chair of the Transportation subcommittee from 1994 until 1996 and chair of the Education subcommittee from 1997 until 2003.

Since 2004, he has been a member of the Baltimore City Board of School Commissioners.

Election results
2002 Race for Maryland House of Delegates – District 42
Voters to choose three:
{| class="wikitable"
!Name
!Votes
!Percent
!Outcome
|-
|-
|Susan Aumann, Rep.
|21,326
|  17.2%
|   Won
|-
|-
|William J. Frank, Rep.
|20,881
|  16.9%
|   Won
|-
|-
|John G. Trueschler, Rep.
|21,591
|  17.4%
|   Won
|-
|-
|Stephen W. Lafferty, Dem.
|18,958
|  15.3%
|   Lost
|-
|James W. Campbell, Dem.
|18,168
|  14.7%
|   Lost
|-
|-
|Matthew Joseph, Dem.
|17,478
|  14.1%
|   Lost
|-
|-
|Rick Kunkel, Green
|5,464
|  4.4%
|   Lost
|-
|Other Write-Ins
|66
|  0.1%
|   Lost
|}

1998 Race for Maryland House of Delegates – District 42
Voters to choose three:
{| class="wikitable"
!Name
!Votes
!Percent
!Outcome
|-
|-
|Samuel I. Rosenberg, Dem.
|21,768
|  30%
|   Won
|-
|-
|James W. Campbell, Dem.
|20,903
|  29%
|   Won
|-
|-
|Maggie McIntosh, Dem.
|20,443
|  29%
|   Won
|-
|-
|Jeffrey B. Smith Jr., Rep.
|8,399
|  12%
|   Lost
|}

1994 Race for Maryland House of Delegates – District 42
Voters to choose three:
{| class="wikitable"
!Name
!Votes
!Percent
!Outcome
|-
|-
|Samuel I. Rosenberg, Dem.
|22,464
|  35%
|   Won
|-
|-
|James W. Campbell, Dem.
|20,944
|  33%
|   Won
|-
|-
|Maggie McIntosh, Dem.
|20,840
|  32%
|   Won
|}

1990 Race for Maryland House of Delegates – District 42
Voters to choose three:
{| class="wikitable"
!Name
!Votes
!Percent
!Outcome
|-
|-
|Samuel I. Rosenberg, Dem.
|12,633
|  34%
|   Won
|-
|-
|James W. Campbell, Dem.
|12,477
|  34%
|   Won
|-
|-
|Delores G. Kelley, Dem.
|11,949
|  32%
|   Won
|}

1986 Race for Maryland House of Delegates – District 42
Voters to choose three:
{| class="wikitable"
!Name
!Votes
!Percent
!Outcome
|-
|-
|Samuel I. Rosenberg, Dem.
|16,143
|  30%
|   Won
|-
|-
|James W. Campbell, Dem.
|16,000
|  30%
|   Won
|-
|-
|David B. Shapiro, Dem.
|14,978
|  28%
|   Won
|-
|-
|Nicholas B. Fessenden, Rep.
|3,396
|  6%
|   Lost
|-
|-
|Ernest B. Gray Sr., Rep.
|2,750
|  5%
|   Lost
|}

References and notes

External links
 http://www.msa.md.gov/msa/mdmanual/06hse/former/html/msa12198.html

School board members in Maryland
Democratic Party members of the Maryland House of Delegates
Politicians from Baltimore
University of Baltimore alumni
University of Maryland, Baltimore alumni
1947 births
Living people